is a railway station on the West Japan Railway Company (JR West) Osaka Loop Line in Jōtō-ku, Osaka, Japan. The station name translates as Osaka Castle Park.

The station was designed to reflect the architecture of Ōsakajō (Ōsaka Castle), for which the station gets its name. This could be seen in the black and white coloured contrast of the walls, and the green-coloured roofs (representing the iconic colour of corroded copper roofs that Ōsakajō is well known for having).

Layout
There are two side platforms with two tracks on the ground level.

Surroundings
Osaka Castle
Osaka-jo Hall
Osaka Business Park
Osaka Suijō Bus Ōsakajō Pier

Stations next to Osakajō-kōen

History 
Ōsakajō-kōen Station opened on 1 October 1983.

Station numbering was introduced in March 2018 with Teradacho being assigned station number JR-O07.

References 

Osaka Castle
Chūō-ku, Osaka
Jōtō-ku, Osaka
Railway stations in Osaka
Railway stations in Japan opened in 1983
Stations of West Japan Railway Company